The 2023 NFL season is scheduled to be the 104th season of the National Football League (NFL). The season is planned to begin on September 7, 2023, with defending Super Bowl LVII champion Kansas City hosting the NFL Kickoff Game, and end on January 7, 2024. 

The playoffs are then scheduled to start on January 13, and conclude with Super Bowl LVIII, the league's championship game, at Allegiant Stadium in Paradise, Nevada, on February 11.

Player movement
The 2023 NFL league year and trading period began on March 15. On March 13, teams were allowed to exercise options for 2023 on players with option clauses in their contracts, submit qualifying offers to their pending restricted free agents, and submit a Minimum Salary Tender to retain exclusive negotiating rights to their players with expiring 2022 contracts and fewer than three accrued seasons of free agent credit. Teams were required to be under the salary cap using the "top 51" definition (in which the 51 highest paid-players on the team's payroll must have a combined salary cap). On March 15, clubs were allowed to contact and begin contract negotiations with players whose contracts had expired and thus became unrestricted free agents.

Free agency
Free agency began on March 15. Notable players to change teams included:

Quarterbacks Jacoby Brissett (Cleveland to Washington), Derek Carr (Las Vegas to New Orleans), Jimmy Garoppolo (San Francisco to Las Vegas), and Baker Mayfield (Los Angeles Rams to Tampa Bay)
Running backs D'Onta Foreman (Carolina to Chicago), David Montgomery (Chicago to Detroit), Miles Sanders (Philadelphia to Carolina), and Jamaal Williams (Detroit to New Orleans)
Wide receivers Allen Lazard (Green Bay to New York Jets), Jakobi Meyers (New England to Las Vegas), JuJu Smith-Schuster (Kansas City to New England), Adam Thielen (Minnesota to Carolina), and Robert Woods (Tennessee to Houston)
Tight ends Mike Gesicki (Miami to New England), Hayden Hurst (Cincinnati to Carolina), and Robert Tonyan (Green Bay to Chicago) 
Offensive linemen Orlando Brown Jr. (Kansas City to Cincinnati), Mike McGlinchey (San Francisco to Denver), Ben Powers (Baltimore to Denver), Jawaan Taylor (Jacksonville to Kansas City), and Andrew Wylie (Kansas City to Washington)
Defensive linemen Zach Allen (Arizona to Denver), Marcus Davenport (New Orleans to Minnesota), Javon Hargrave (Philadelphia to San Francisco), Dre'Mont Jones (Denver to Seattle), and DeMarcus Walker (Tennessee to Chicago)
Linebackers Tremaine Edmunds (Buffalo to Chicago), and T.J. Edwards (Philadelphia to Chicago)
Defensive backs Marcus Epps (Philadelphia to Las Vegas), Jessie Bates III (Cincinnati to Atlanta), Byron Murphy (Arizona to Minnesota), Cameron Sutton (Pittsburgh to Detroit), Juan Thornhill (Kansas City to Cleveland), and Jimmie Ward (San Francisco to Houston)
Kicker Matt Gay (Los Angeles Rams to Indianapolis)

Trades 
The following notable trades were made during the 2023 league year:

 March 15: The Los Angeles Rams traded CB Jalen Ramsey to Miami in exchange for TE Hunter Long and a 2023 third round selection.
 March 15: Indianapolis traded CB Stephon Gilmore to Dallas in exchange for a 2023 fifth round selection.
 March 15: Las Vegas traded TE Darren Waller to the New York Giants in exchange for a 2023 third round selection.
 March 15: Carolina traded WR D.J. Moore, 2023 first and second round selections (Nos. 9 and 61), a 2024 first round selection, and a 2025 second round selection to Chicago in exchange for a 2023 first round selection (No. 1).

Retirements 

Notable retirements

 QB Tom Brady – Fifteen-time Pro Bowler, six-time All-Pro (three first-team, three second-team), seven-time Super Bowl champion (XXXVI, XXXVIII, XXXIX, XLIX, LI, LIII, and LV), five-time Super Bowl MVP (XXXVI, XXXVIII, XLIX, LI, and LV), three-time NFL MVP (2007, 2010, and 2017), two-time Offensive Player of the Year (2007 and 2010), and 2009 Comeback Player of the Year. Played for New England and Tampa Bay during his 23-year career.
 WR Antonio Brown – Seven-time Pro Bowler, five-time All-Pro (four first-team, one second-team), and Super Bowl LV champion. Played for Pittsburgh, New England, and Tampa Bay during his 12-year career.
 WR A. J. Green – Seven-time Pro Bowler and two-time second-team All-Pro. Played for Cincinnati and Arizona during his 12-year career.
 DE J. J. Watt – Five-time Pro Bowler, seven-time All-Pro (five first-team, two second-team), three-time Defensive Player of the Year (2012, 2014, and 2015), and 2017 Walter Payton Man of the Year. Played for Houston and Arizona during his 12-year career.

Other retirements
 Nasir Adderley
 Chris Banjo
 Austin Blythe
 Donte Deayon
 Chad Henne
 Josh Lambo
 Blake Martinez
 Devin McCourty
 Davis Webb
 Eli Wolf

Draft
The 2023 NFL Draft is scheduled to be held outside Union Station in Kansas City, Missouri, on April 27–29. However, it was traded to Carolina.

2023 deaths

Pro Football Hall of Fame Members

Bobby Beathard Beathard was the general manager of the Washington Redskins from 1978 to 1989 and the San Diego Chargers from 1990 to 2000, as well as serving as the Miami Dolphins' director of player personnel from 1972 to 1977, and was inducted into the Hall of Fame in 2018. He was a four-time Super Bowl champion (VII, VIII, XVII, and XXII). He died on January 30, age 86.
Bud Grant Grant was the head coach of the Minnesota Vikings from 1967 to 1983 and the 1985 season. He won an NFL championship with the Vikings in 1969 and was inducted into the Hall of Fame in 1994. He died on March 11, age 95.
Art McNally McNally was the director of officiating for the NFL from 1968 to 1991. He was inducted into the Hall of Fame in 2022, becoming the first official to receive the honor. He died on January 1, age 97.

Others

Rule changes
The following rule changes for the 2023 season have been proposed and will be voted on at the NFL Owners' Meeting: 
 Changing the jersey numbering system by allowing the number 0 to be worn by all positions currently allowed to wear single-digit numbers, and allowing place kickers and punters to wear numbers 0–49 and 90–99.
 Allowing a scrimmage play in lieu of an onside kick.  The play would be from the offense's 20 yard line and the offense must gain at least 20 yards on one play to retain possession. This procedure can only be used twice in a single game and the team requesting it must be behind in the score. This is similar to onside kick variations adopted in the USFL and XFL, and previously in the defunct AAF.
Changing timing rules after a replay challenge reverses the call on the field. If outside the two-minute warning, the play clock will be set to 40 seconds instead of 25.  If inside the two minute warning and a 10-second runoff is used, the play clock would be set to 30 seconds.
Adding personal fouls to the replay-reviewable calls, but only on a coach's challenge.
Adding Roughing the Passer as a reviewable play, either by the replay official or a coach’s challenge.  
Allowing a third coach's challenge if at least one of the two provided challenges is successful.  Currently a third challenge is awarded ONLY if the first two were successful.
Allowing the replay official to consult on penalty enforcement
Adding turnover on downs to the list of booth reviewable plays (not challengeable by coaches).
Abolish all crackback blocks.

Preseason
The majority of training camps are planned to open on July 26. The preseason is scheduled to begin on August 3 with the Pro Football Hall of Fame Game.

Regular season
The season is planned to be played over an 18-week schedule beginning on September 7. Each of the league's 32 teams plays 17 games, with one bye week for each team. The regular season is scheduled to end on January 7, 2024; all games during the final weekend will be intra-division games, as it has been since .

Each team plays the other three teams in its own division twice, one game against each of the four teams from a division in its own conference, one game against each of the four teams from a division in the other conference, one game against each of the remaining two teams in its conference that finished in the same position in their respective divisions the previous season (e.g., the team that finished fourth in its division would play all three other teams in its conference that also finished fourth in their divisions), and one game against a team in another division in the other conference that also finished in the same position in their respective division the previous season.

The division pairings for 2023 are as follows:

Highlights of the 2023 season are planned to include (with, unless otherwise noted, specific teams and kickoff times to be announced at a later date):
 NFL Kickoff Game: The 2023 season is scheduled to begin with the Kickoff Game on September 7 in primetime, expected to be hosted by defending Super Bowl LVII champion Kansas City.
NFL International Series: This will be the second year under a three-year deal in which games will be held annually at London's Wembley Stadium, with Jacksonville as the designated home team. On January 19, the league announced that Buffalo and Tennessee will each host games at London's Tottenham Hotspur Stadium. The league also announced two games will be played in Germany, at Deutsche Bank Park in Frankfurt and/or Allianz Arena in Munich. Kansas City and New England will host these games.
Thanksgiving: As has been the case since , three games are scheduled for Thursday, November 23, with Detroit and Dallas hosting the traditional afternoon doubleheader games, and another game in primetime, As part of a new media agreement with Amazon Prime Video, this will be the first season that a game will be scheduled on the Friday afternoon after Thanksgiving.
Christmas: Christmas Day, December 25, lands on a Monday. Fox will air games on Christmas Day as the schedule allows per the new media contracts.

Changes to flexible scheduling rules
As part of the new media agreements, the league's flexible scheduling system has been modified this season to include Monday Night Football games, and increase the amount of cross-flexing (switching) of Sunday afternoon games between CBS and Fox. Games can now be flexed into Monday Night Football similar to how games can be flexed into NBC Sunday Night Football or into Saturdays on the final four weeks of the season. CBS and Fox will still be able to protect a limited number of games involving a specific number of AFC or NFC teams, respectively.

Scheduling changes 
Week 18: Two games with playoff implications are planned to be moved to Saturday, January 6, at 4:30 p.m. and 8:15 p.m. ET, both airing on ESPN, ABC, and ESPN+. Another game with playoff implications will be moved into NBC Sunday Night Football at 8:20 p.m. ET. The rest will be scheduled as Sunday afternoon games on CBS or Fox.

Postseason

The 2023 playoffs are scheduled to begin with the wild-card round, with three wild-card games played in each conference. Wild Card Weekend is planned for January 13–15, 2024. In the Divisional round scheduled for January 20–21, the top seed in the conference will play the lowest remaining seed and the other two remaining teams will play each other. The winners of those games will advance to the Conference Championship games scheduled for January 28. Super Bowl LVIII is scheduled for February 11 at Allegiant Stadium in Paradise, Nevada.

Head coaching and front office changes

Head coaches

Off-season

Front office personnel

Off-season

Uniforms

Uniform changes 

 Philadelphia announced the return of their Kelly green throwback uniforms for the 2023 season on March 29, 2022. According to Eagles owner Jeffrey Lurie, this version will be modeled after the set from 1985–1995. The Eagles last featured Kelly green uniforms during the 2010 season.
 Seattle announced that they would reintroduce their 1990s era uniforms as a part of the "NFL's classic uniform program" during the 2023 season on November 27, 2022.
 Tampa Bay announced the return of the throwback "creamsicle" uniforms worn from 1976–1996 on February 28, 2022. The team intended to wear the design during the 2022 season but delayed its reintroduction until 2023, citing supply chain issues. The team will wear this design for the first time since the 2012 season.
 Tennessee will wear an iteration of a Houston Oilers-era uniform for one home game. The Titans last wore Oilers uniforms during the 2009 season as part of the NFL's commemoration of the American Football League's 50th anniversary.

Alternate helmets 

 Denver is reportedly considering an alternate helmet to be worn during the season.
 Detroit will introduce an alternate helmet in 2023. Team president Rod Wood said that the Lions would consider new uniforms to be implemented in 2023, though it was later reported that the changes would not take place until 2024.

Media
This will be the first season under new 11-year media rights agreements with CBS, Fox, NBC, and ESPN/ABC, renewing their existing packages through the 2033 season. All four networks retain their respective slates of games (AFC, NFC, Sunday Night Football, and Monday Night Football respectively), digital rights for their respective streaming services (including Paramount+, Peacock, and ESPN+), and rights for their respective Spanish networks (including Fox Deportes, ESPN Deportes and Universo/Telemundo). Changes beginning this season include the following:
 Flexible scheduling has been expanded to include Monday Night Football, and increase the amount of "cross-flexing" (switching) Sunday afternoon games between CBS and Fox. CBS and Fox will be able to protect a limited number of games involving a specific number of teams from their respective conference.
 There will be three weeks featuring two Monday Night Football games split between ABC and ESPN, expanding from one in the 2022 season.
 NBC will stream one exclusive national game on Peacock per season.
 Fox will air national Christmas Day games as the schedule permits.
 The four broadcasters will now each air one divisional playoff game per season, with ABC/ESPN taking over the slot that was previously rotated annually between CBS and Fox.
 ABC has been added to the annual Super Bowl rotation, with four broadcasters in the following order: CBS, Fox, NBC, ABC.

Under previous deals for the Wild Card playoffs, CBS, NBC, and Fox will continue to annually rotate the two extra Wild Card games gained by the 2020 playoff expansion. ABC/ESPN will continue to only air one Wild Card game per season, the third year under their five-year deal to broadcast the Monday night Wild Card game. This will also be the third season under NBC's seven-year deal for the Sunday night Wild Card game.

This will be the second season that ESPN+ will stream one exclusive International Series game per season.

This will also be the second season of Amazon Prime Video's rights to Thursday Night Football. A new game on the Friday after Thanksgiving will also be added, returning the Thursday Night Football package to Thanksgiving weekend for the first time since 2012 (when the Thanksgiving primetime game was reassigned to Sunday Night Football as part of the previous contract renewal). Unlike the other Thursday Night Football games, whose free broadcasts are exclusive to sister live streaming platform Twitch, the "Black Friday" game will also be carried for free within the main Amazon Prime Video platform.

NFL Network will continue to televise select regular season games, featuring International Series and late-season Saturday games. NFL+ will continue to simulcast all local and national primetime regular season games on mobile devices, all out of market preseason games live (national games for mobile devices only), along with replays of all games.

NFL Sunday Ticket
For residential customers in the United States, this will be the first season that the NFL Sunday Ticket out-of-market sports package will exclusively be on YouTube TV, as well as on YouTube's Primetime Channels service as a standalone subscription option. DirecTV declined to renew its exclusive rights to NFL Sunday Ticket, which it held since the package's debut in 1994. It is unknown whether DirecTV will continue to hold the rights to offer NFL Sunday Ticket to bars, restaurants, and other commercial venues, allowing them to continue showing games without having to reconfigure their systems to accommodate a streaming-only platform.

International 
On February 7, 2023, the NFL announced a new deal with DAZN to become the worldwide rightsholder of its NFL Game Pass streaming service outside of the U.S. and China. DAZN had already held the rights to Game Pass and Sunday Ticket in Canada.

References

NFL
National Football League seasons